Ground game may refer to any of these:
Ground fighting, hand-to-hand combat that takes place while the combatants are on the ground.
Ground Game Act 1880, United Kingdom law giving land occupiers the unalienable right to kill rabbits and hares
Grassroots, political movement driven "from below" by the actual constituents of a community rather than its leaders.
Canvassing, the main activity of a political ground game
In American football, an offensive strategy based on running the ball rather than relying on the forward pass
Ground Game Sportswear, brand of sports wear and gear dedicated for martial arts, mainly for brazilian jiu-jitsu.